Newport City Council is the governing body for Newport, one of the Principal Areas of Wales. It consists of 51 councillors, who represent the city's 20 wards.

The council is currently, and has historically been, held by the Labour Party. However from 2008 to 2012 the council was controlled jointly by the Conservatives and Liberal Democrats due to there being no party with an overall majority.

Between 1996 and 2002 the authority was known as Newport County Borough Council.

History
Newport is an ancient mesne borough, occupying an important position on the Welsh Marches. The town grew up round the castle built early in the 12th century. Giraldus Cambrensis, writing in 1187, calls it Novus Burgus, probably to distinguish it from Caerleon, whose prosperity declined as that of Newport increased. The first lord was Robert Fitzhamon, who died in 1107, and from him the lordship passed to the Earls of Gloucester and Stafford and the Dukes of Buckingham. Hugh le Despenser, who held the lordship for a short time, obtained in 1323 a charter of liberties for the burgesses, granting them freedom from toll throughout England, Ireland and Aquitaine. Hugh, Earl of Stafford granted a further charter in 1385, confirmed by his grandson in 1427, which gave the burgesses the right of self-government and of a merchant gild. On the attainder of the Duke of Buckingham in 1483 the lordship lapsed to the crown, of whom it was held in the 16th and 17th centuries by the Pembrokes, and in the 19th by the Beauforts.

The town was incorporated by Royal Charter of James I in 1623 and confirmed by Charles II in 1685. This created a corporation which consisted of a mayor and twelve aldermen who governed the borough and were responsible for law and order. They were assisted by a recorder and two bailiffs. This system of government lasted in essence until the town was reformed as a municipal borough in 1836 under the Municipal Corporations Act 1835. This reconstituted the corporation as an elected borough council, comprising a mayor, aldermen and councillors. The Newport Borough Police was also formed in 1836.

In 1934 the borough was enlarged by taking in parts of the surrounding parishes of St Woolos, Christchurch, Malpas and Bettws.

When elected county councils were established in 1889 under the Local Government Act 1888, Newport was included in the administrative county of Monmouthshire, being governed by Monmouthshire County Council, which chose to base itself in Newport. Just over two years later, on 7 November 1891, Newport was one of the first places to become a county borough (other than those which had been created directly by the 1888 act), making it administratively independent from Monmouthshire County Council. The new Newport Civic Centre, designed by architect Thomas Cecil Howitt, was completed in 1964.

Further local government reorganisation in 1974 saw the abolition of county boroughs. Newport became a lower-tier district with borough status. The reformed borough covered a larger area than the former county borough, covering the whole of two former districts and most of a third, which were abolished at the same time:
Caerleon Urban District
Magor and St Mellons Rural District, except Henllys (which went to Torfaen) and St Mellons (which went to Cardiff)
Newport County Borough
In 1996, another wave of local-government reorganisation reverted the council to its previous status of a self-governing county borough, taking over the functions of the abolished Gwent County Council in the area. In 2002 Newport was granted formal city status as part of a contest for the Queen's Golden Jubilee in 2002, in which one Welsh town was eligible to be awarded city status.

Political control
The first election to the council following the Local Government Act 1972 was held in 1973, initially operating as a shadow authority until the reforms under that act took effect on 1 April 1974. Political control of the council since 1974 has been held by the following parties:

Lower-tier borough

County borough

Leadership

The leaders of the council since 2004 have been:

Current composition 
As of 5 May 2022:

Re-elected councillors in bold:

Party with majority control in bold

Elections
Elections take place every five years. The last election was 5 May 2022.

In March 2017 a new political party, the Newport Independents Party, was formed to field candidates in the May 2017 election. It won four seats.

Party with the most elected councillors in bold. Coalition agreements in notes column.

Wards

The city is divided into 21 wards, since May 2022 electing 51 councillors. Most of these wards are coterminous with communities (parishes) of the same name. Each community can have an elected council. The following table lists city council wards, communities and associated geographical areas. Communities with a community council are indicated with a '*':

Sites
Newport Civic Centre
Mansion House

In the news
In October 2013, the controversial demolition of a 35-metre long Chartist Mural reached national attention. The 35-year-old mural commemorated Newport's Chartist history, specifically the Newport Rising of 1839. The Guardian suggested it was "not just budgets, but a collective cultural history that's under attack.". A spokesman for the council stated that the mural "has served to remind us of Newport’s past, but we must now focus on Newport’s future." Actor Michael Sheen helped to found a trust, to commission a new memorial, with £50,000 of funding provided by Newport City Council.

It was announced in July 2019 that Council Chief Executive Will Godfrey would be resigning in early October after six years to take over at Bath and North East Somerset Council. The Council have stated that as of September 2019, more time is needed to find a replacement, and that an interim CEO will be in place for six to twelve months.

The Council instructed the operators of new "pod" accommodation for homeless people in the city to take down the facilities August 2019 until they were subject to safety inspections and certification.

In September 2019 the council were criticised for delays in arranging school transport for those attending the independent Priory College South Wales at Coleg Gwent in Pontypool.

The Council were reported in September 2019 as being involved in a new trial with Sustrans Cymru, aimed at improving safety outside city primary schools through use of temporary barriers, road and pavement painting, and temporary school crossings.

In September 2019 the Council's then leader Debbie Wilcox was announced as a Labour life peer as part of Theresa May's 2019 Prime Minister's Resignation Honours. She confirmed later that month that she would be stepping down as Leader of the Council, with a successor to be named.

The Council announced in September 2019 that the city's Market Arcade would be closed due to anti-social behaviour, after the Council secured a Public Spaces Protection order to take effect daily from 8pm until 7am. The move came after complaints about city centre drug abuse, property damage, and noise.

The Council has received £4m in Welsh Government funds to pursue a footbridge replacement over Newport railway station, connecting Devon Place and Queensway. It is projected for completion in 2020.

References

External links 
 
Ward profiles

Local authorities of Wales
Organisations based in Newport, Wales
Politics of Newport, Wales
1623 establishments in Wales